TF Sport is a racing team that competes in motorsport events throughout Europe including the FIA World Endurance Championship and the 24 hours of Le Mans, headed by Tom Ferrier and supported by Aston Martin Racing.

Overview
Founded in 2014 by former British Touring Car and British GT driver, Tom Ferrier, TF Sport dovetailed a third British GT campaign with a strong European competition programme in the newly established GT3 Le Mans Cup and International GT Open.

Having successfully competed in 2015 in the Blancpain Series, the GT cup and the International GT Open, TF Sport has launched an additional campaign for the Michelin GT3 Le Mans Cup title in the 2016 season.

Championship titles at home and abroad turned 2016 into a breakthrough year for TF Sport, but 2017 promises to be even more momentous, as the official Aston Martin Racing Partner Team is set to step over to GTE-spec machinery for a dream assault on the European Le Mans Series and the legendary 24 Hours of Le Mans.

British GT results

FIA WEC results

European Le Mans Series results

Blancpain GT Series Endurance Cup results

24 Hours of Le Mans results

Michelin Le Mans Cup

International GT Open results

External links

References

British auto racing teams
British GT Championship teams
WeatherTech SportsCar Championship teams
European Le Mans Series teams
International GT Open teams
Blancpain Endurance Series teams
FIA World Endurance Championship teams
Auto racing teams established in 2014
2014 establishments in England
24 Hours of Le Mans teams